The canton of Valserhône (before March 2020: canton of Bellegarde-sur-Valserine) is an administrative division in eastern France. At the French canton reorganisation which came into effect in March 2015, the canton was expanded from 12 to 15 communes (2 of which were merged into the new communes Surjoux-Lhopital and Valserhône):
 
Billiat
Champfromier
Chanay
Confort
Giron
Injoux-Génissiat
Montanges
Plagne
Saint-Germain-de-Joux
Surjoux-Lhopital
Valserhône
Villes

Demographics

References

See also
Cantons of the Ain department 
Communes of France

Cantons of Ain